Nyamirambo is a sector (umurenge) in Nyarugenge District, Kigali Province, Rwanda.

Location
It is located in the southwest part of the city of Kigali. The coordinates of Nyamirambo Sector are:1°59'37.0"S, 30°02'39.0"E (Latitude:-1.993611; Longitude:30.044167).

Overview

It is a mixed residential and commercial sector, with many mosques. AB Bank Rwanda, a microfinance bank maintains a branch in the sector.

Sectors of Nyarugenge District
Nyarugenge district is divided into 10 sectors (imirenge): Gitega, Kanyinya, Kigali, Kimisagara, Mageragere, Muhima, Nyakabanda, Nyamirambo, Nyarugenge, and Rwezamenyo.

References

External links
 Nyamirambo Women's Centre

Kigali
Sectors of Rwanda